The 1982–83 Irish Cup was the 103rd edition of Northern Ireland's premier football knock-out cup competition. It began on 22 January 1983, and concluded on 7 May 1983 with the replayed final. The cup was expanded this season, doubling the number of clubs taking part to 32. The extra clubs meant that an additional round was added to the competition.

Linfield were the defending champions after winning their 33rd Irish Cup last season, defeating Coleraine 2–1 in the 1982 final. This season they reached the final again, but lost to archrivals Glentoran after a replay. Glentoran won their 10th Irish Cup, defeating Linfield 2–1 in the final replay, after the first game was a 1–1 draw.

Results

First round

|}

Replays

|}

Second replay

|}

Second round

|}

Replays

|}

Quarter-finals

|}

Replay

|}

Semi-finals

|}

Final

Replay

References

1982-83
North
2